Kalinovka is a rural locality (a selo) in Krasnoselskoye Rural Settlement, Yuryev-Polsky District, Vladimir Oblast, Russia. The population was 167 as of 2010.

Geography 
Kalinovka is located 4 km east of Yuryev-Polsky (the district's administrative centre) by road. Kumino is the nearest rural locality.

References 

Rural localities in Yuryev-Polsky District